Paul Oscar Adolph Husting (April 25, 1866October 21, 1917) was an American lawyer and Democratic politician from Mayville, Wisconsin.  He was the first popularly-elected United States Senator from Wisconsin, serving from 1915 until his death in 1917.  He previously served eight years in the Wisconsin Senate, representing Dodge County, and was district attorney for four years.  He was a grandson of Solomon Juneau, the founder of Milwaukee.

Background and early career 
Husting was born April 25, 1866, in Fond du Lac, Wisconsin.  Husting moved with his parents to Mayville, Wisconsin, in 1876, where he received a common school education. From the age of 17 years, he became successively a retail clerk in a general store, a railway postal clerk, a mailing clerk in the Wisconsin State Prison at Waupun, and assistant bookkeeper in the office of the Secretary of State of Wisconsin under Thomas J. Cunningham.

Husting entered the University of Wisconsin Law School, passed the state bar examination, and was admitted to the bar in 1895. He initially practiced law in Mayville by himself, but in 1897 associated himself with C. W. Lamoreux until the latter was elected judge, upon which the firm of Husting & Brother was formed.

Public office 
Husting was elected district attorney of Dodge County in 1902 and reelected in 1904. He was elected to the state senate in 1906, and reelected in 1910. In the state senate, he advocated conservation of the state's natural resources, the income tax, the "Husting bill" establishing a maximum passenger railroad fare of two cents per mile, initiative and referendum, and direct election of United States senators. He offered the original resolution to investigate, and assisted in the investigation of, the Wisconsin primary and election of 1908, which resulted in the enactment of the state's Corrupt Practices Act.

Husting was the first United States senator from Wisconsin to be elected by a direct vote of the people, defeating the incumbent Governor, Francis E. McGovern, at the November 1914 election by 967 votes.  He succeeded Isaac Stephenson as the United States senator on March 4, 1915, and served in the Senate from 1915 until his death.  During his time in the U.S. Senate, he was chairman of the Committee on Fisheries during 1917 and chairman of a special committee investigating trespasses on Indian lands during his entire time in the Senate.

Husting was the only Democrat to win a state-wide election in Wisconsin between 1892 and 1932.

Death and political consequences 

Husting was killed in a duck hunting accident on Rush Lake near Pickett, Wisconsin. While rising in a row boat after telling his brother Gustav to fire, Gustav accidentally shot his brother in the back. Husting fell into a coma, and died later that same day. The New York Times described him as "the most aggressive leader" of the "loyalist" (i.e., supportive of Woodrow Wilson's pro-Allied policies) forces in Wisconsin, and contrasted him with "Senator La Follette and the pro-German constituency behind him". He is interred on the Husting family plot at Graceland Cemetery in Mayville.

Husting's death was of political importance. In 1919 the Senate would have been under Democratic control had he not been succeeded by Republican Irvine Lenroot, as a consequence of which in 1919 the Senate had 49 Republicans and 47 Democrats (Vice-President Thomas R. Marshall was a Democrat, and had the power to break all ties).

Personal life and family
Paul Husting was the second of seven children born to John P. and Mary M. ( Juneau) Husting.  John P. Husting had emigrated to Wisconsin from the Grand Duchy of Luxemburg in 1855.  Mary M. Juneau was the twelfth of sixteen children born to Solomon Juneau—the co-founder and first mayor of Milwaukee, Wisconsin.

Husting's younger brother, Berthold Juneau "Bert" Husting, had a brief career in professional baseball and was later United States Attorney for the Eastern District of Wisconsin in the 1940s.

His older brother, Charles Ottomar "Otto" Husting, served as Paul's private secretary in the U.S. Senate.

Electoral history

Wisconsin Senate (1906, 1910)

| colspan="6" style="text-align:center;background-color: #e9e9e9;"| General Election, November 6, 1906

| colspan="6" style="text-align:center;background-color: #e9e9e9;"| General Election, November 8, 1910

U.S. Senate (1914)

| colspan="6" style="text-align:center;background-color: #e9e9e9;"| Democratic Primary, September 1, 1914

| colspan="6" style="text-align:center;background-color: #e9e9e9;"| General Election, November 3, 1914

See also
 List of United States Congress members who died in office (1900–49)

References

External links

Paul Husting, late a senator from Wisconsin, Memorial addresses delivered in the House of Representatives and Senate frontispiece 1919

|-

|-

|-

|-

|-

1866 births
1917 deaths
19th-century American politicians
Accidental deaths in Wisconsin
American people of French-Canadian descent
American people of Luxembourgian descent
Deaths by firearm in Wisconsin
Democratic Party United States senators from Wisconsin
Democratic Party Wisconsin state senators
District attorneys in Wisconsin
Firearm accident victims in the United States
Hunting accident deaths
Juneau family
People from Fond du Lac, Wisconsin
People from Mayville, Wisconsin
University of Wisconsin Law School alumni